Tarua is a dish of thinly sliced vegetables coated with rice batter and deep fried. It originates from the South Asia, and is popular among Maithils of India and Nepal. It is a popular and special dish of the Mithila region where it is believed that it is impossible to welcome a guest without serving Tarua.

Preparation
Tarua is made from cutting green vegetables and vegetable leafs into different shapes. They are dipped in a batter made from gram flour or rice flour with added black pepper, red chili powder and salt, which is later deep fried in oil.

Variations
Tarua can be made from any green vegetable. The most popular varieties of Tarua include Tilkor tarua, made from Tilkor leaves, and Aloo tarua, made from potato. Other varieties of tarua include Bhindi tarua, made from okra, Kobi tarua, made from cauliflower, Baigan tarua, made from brinjal, Kadima tarua, made from pumpkin, Kaddu tarua, made from bottle gourd, Karela tarua, made from bitter gourd, Ol tarua, made from elephant foot yam, Aurabi tarua, made from taro, Kumahar tarua, made from ash gourd, Khamharua tarua, made from Dioscorea satiea, Parwal tarua, made from pointed gourd.

See also
 Pakora
 Fritter

References

Nepalese cuisine
Deep fried foods
Indian cuisine
Bihari cuisine